Christian Tuxen Falbe (5 April 1791– 19 July 1849)   was a  Danish naval officer, archaeologist, explorer, cartographer and diplomat.

Biography
Falbe was born at Helsingør. He was the son of Ulrik Anton Falbe (1746-95), an inspector at Øresund Custom House and the father of the diplomat Christian Frederik Falbe (1828-1896).

In 1807, he became a second lieutenant. He was appointed lieutenant-lieutenant in 1815. By 1820, he became a lieutenant-captain.

He was a consul to the Beylik of Tunis between 1821 and 1831. In 1833, he was relocated to Greece. Between 1837-38, he undertook  a voyage in the Algerian provinces of Constantine and Tunis. In 1838, he participated in a scientific expedition to study the ruins of Carthage. He was the first to perform an archaeological survey on the site of Carthage and the first to produce a modern map of Tunis. In 1841, he resigned as a vessel commander-in-chief. From 1842, he was director of the king's collections at Amalienborg and, from 1847, director of the royal coin cabinet at Rosenborg Castle.

In 1813, he received the Knights' Cross of the Order of the Dannebrog.

He died in 1849 and was buried at Holmen Cemetery (Holmens Kirkegård) in Copenhagen.

References

Bibliography
 Recherches sur l’emplacement de Carthage (planches), Paris, Imprimé par autorisation du roi à l'Imprimerie Royale, Paris, Service historique de la Défense, Archives du département de la Marine, 1833
 Description du plan de Tunis et de Carthage, Copenhague, Service historique de la Défense, Département de l'armée de terre, 1-M 1675. Asie et Afrique, Mémoires et reconnaissance/inventaire/série 1M tome II. F 141-166, 1832

Literature 
 Houda Baïr, « La première carte moderne de Tunis (1831-1832). Le travail de Falbe en contexte », Revue européenne de géographie (2009).

1792 births
1849 deaths
19th-century Danish naval officers
People from Helsingør
19th-century Danish diplomats
Danish cartographers
Knights of the Order of the Dannebrog
Tuxen family